Dagfinn Gedde-Dahl (1 March 1937 – 12 June 2016) was a Norwegian physician.

He was born in Florø, a son of Tobias Müller Gedde-Dahl. He served as president of the Norwegian Medical Association from 1976 to 1979. He was a chief physician at the Diakonhjemmet Hospital from 1980 to 1992, and then head physician until 2003.

References

1937 births
2016 deaths
People from Flora, Norway
20th-century Norwegian physicians